Underneath the Rainbow is the seventh studio album by American garage rock band Black Lips, released on March 17, 2014.

Track listing
"Drive by Buddy"
"Smiling"
"Make You Mine"
"Funny"
"Dorner Party"
"Justice After All"
"Boys in the Wood"
"Waiting"
"Do the Vibrate"
"I Don't Wanna Go Home"
"Dandelion Dust"
"Dog Years"

Personnel
Black Lips
 Cole Alexander – guitar, vocals
 Jared Swilley – bass, vocals
 Ian St. Pé – guitar, vocals
 Joe Bradley – drums, vocals

Additional personnel
 Tom Brenneck – baritone guitar
 Andrew Greene – horns
 Dave Guy – horns
 Jared Tankel – horns
 Leon Michels – horns
 Luc Paradis – artwork
 Dave Girard – design
 Nathan Yarborough – engineer
 Roger Moutenot – engineer
 Beau Vallis – mixing engineer
 Joe LaPorta – mastering
 Jimmy Douglass – mixing
 Mick Rock – photography
 Justin McKnight – production
 Patrick Carney – production
 Tom Brenneck – production
 Ed Rawls – production

References

Black Lips albums
2014 albums
Vice Records albums
Albums produced by Patrick Carney